Estelle Caron (December 30, 1926 – April 20, 2010) was a Québécois singer and comedian.

Caron was born in Hull, Quebec on December 30, 1926. She was a member of Montreal-based Les Joyeux Troubadours, a half-hour comedic song and skit program on Radio-Canada, which aired at noon five days a week. Caron performed on the show from 1951 to the show's end in 1977. Despite her radio popularity, she failed to find success as a recording artist or television personality. Caron retired after the end of the radio show and died in Montreal on April 20, 2010. She was preceded by her husband, pianist Jean Larose, with whom she had two children.

Select recordings
 
 
 Estelle Caron Chante Noel (in French). Musirack Inc. 1962.

References

1926 births
2010 deaths
Comedians from Quebec
French-language singers of Canada
Musicians from Gatineau
20th-century Canadian women singers